Tuberolamia is a genus of longhorn beetles of the subfamily Lamiinae, containing the following species:

 Tuberolamia andicola Breuning, 1940
 Tuberolamia grilloides Touroult & Demez, 2012

References

Morimopsini